K Mahendran is a young Indian politician and contested as a candidate of Congress party for the post of MLA in Tamil Nadu Assembly Election 2016 from pattukkottai constituency. He is the one of the secretaries of national committee of Indian Youth Congress.

References

Living people
Indian National Congress politicians from Tamil Nadu
Year of birth missing (living people)